Return Engagement is a 1983 documentary film about the debate tour between Timothy Leary and G. Gordon Liddy. It was directed by Alan Rudolph.

Cast

References

External links 

1983 films
American documentary films
1980s English-language films
American independent films
Films directed by Alan Rudolph
1983 documentary films
Documentary films about American politics
Timothy Leary
1983 independent films
1980s American films